is a Japanese anime director. After joining Shin-Ei Animation, he directed multiple Doraemon anime films. As a freelancer, he also worked on numerous anime adaptations such as Space Brothers, After the Rain, and Komi Can't Communicate.

Biography
Ayumu Watanabe was born in Tokyo on September 3, 1966. He started his career in 1986 when he joined Studio Mates as a key animator. Two years later, Watanabe moved to Shin-Ei Animation, where he worked on the anime adaptation of the Doraemon manga series, as well as direct multiple anime films in the franchise. As a freelancer, he also directed numerous anime adaptations such as Space Brothers, After the Rain, and Komi Can't Communicate. He also worked with Studio 4°C on the films Children of the Sea and Fortune Favors Lady Nikuko.

Works

TV series
 Atashin'chi (2002; storyboards)
 Space Brothers (2012–2014; director)
 Mysterious Girlfriend X (2012; director)
 Danchi Tomoo (2013–2015; director)
 If Her Flag Breaks (2014; director)
 Ace Attorney (2016–2019; director)
 After the Rain (2018; director)
 Gurazeni (2018; director)
 Major 2nd (2018–2020; director)
 Komi Can't Communicate (2021–2022; chief director)
 Summer Time Rendering (2022; director)

Films

Feature films
 Doraemon: Nobita and the Windmasters (2003; chief animation director)
 Doraemon: Nobita in the Wan-Nyan Spacetime Odyssey (2004; assistant director, chief animation director)
 Doraemon: Nobita's Dinosaur 2006 (2006; director, screenplay)
 Doraemon: Nobita and the Green Giant Legend (2008; director)
 Space Brothers #0 (2014; director)
 Children of the Sea (2019; director)
 Fortune Favors Lady Nikuko (2021; director)

Short films
 Doraemon: Doraemon Comes Back (1998; director, animation director)
 Doraemon: Nobita's the Night Before a Wedding (1999; director, animation director)
 Doraemon: A Grandmother's Recollections (2000; director, animation director)
 Doraemon: Ganbare! Gian!! (2001; director)
 Doraemon: Boku no Umareta Hi (2002; director)
 Pa-Pa-Pa the Movie: Perman (2003; director, screenplay)
 Pa-Pa-Pa the Movie: Perman: Tako de Pon! Ashi wa Pon! (2004; director)
 Ōkii Ichinensei to Chiisana Ninensei (2014; director)

References

External links
 

1966 births
Anime directors
Anime screenwriters
Japanese animated film directors
Japanese storyboard artists
Japanese television directors
Living people
People from Tokyo